Every Little Girl's Dream is the second studio album by Canadian country music singer Lisa Brokop. It was released on September 6, 1994 by Patriot/Liberty. "Give Me a Ring Sometime," "Take That," "One of Those Nights" and "Who Needs You" were all released as singles. The album has been certified Gold in Canada by the CRIA for sales of 50,000 copies.

Track listing
"Take That" (Gary Burr, Tom Shapiro) - 3:31
"One of Those Nights" (Conway Twitty, Troy Seals) - 3:34
"You Already Drove Me There" (Scott Edwards Phelps, Cyril Rawson) - 3:32
"Give Me a Ring Sometime" (Kris Bergsnes, Bob Moulds, Sharon Anderson) - 3:01
"Every Little Girl's Dream" (Dave Loggins, Kenny Mims) - 4:05
"Never Did Say Goodbye" (Jeff Black) - 4:18
"Who Needs You" (Skip Ewing, Mickey Cates) - 3:25
"Not Here in My Arms" (Paul Nelson, Gene Nelson) - 3:39
"Let Me Live Another Day" (Byron Hill, Wayne Tester) - 3:36
"Never Gonna Be Your Fool Again" (Danny Mayo, Dickey Lee, DeAnna Cox) - 3:01

Personnel
Adapted from Every Little Girl's Dream liner notes.

Musicians
 Eddie Bayers - drums
 Gary Burr - background vocals
 Carol Chase - background vocals
 Dale Daniel - background vocals
 Paul Franklin - steel guitar
 Sonny Garrish - steel guitar
 Steve Gibson - acoustic guitar
 Greg Gordon - background vocals
 Dann Huff - electric guitar
 Mitch Humphreys - piano, synthesizer
 David Hungate - bass guitar
 John Barlow Jarvis - synthesizer
 Dirk Johnson - synthesizer
 Tom Roady - percussion
 Judy Rodman - background vocals
 Brent Rowan - electric guitar
 Reggie Young - electric guitar

Technical
 Jerry Crutchfield - producer
 Tim Kish - recording, overdubbing
 Lynn Peterzell - mixing
 Denny Purcell - mastering
 Craig White - recording, overdubbing

References 

1994 albums
Lisa Brokop albums
Liberty Records albums
Albums produced by Jerry Crutchfield